James Stephen McKenna (born 9 October 1942) is a Scottish actor. He is known for his roles as Jack Osborne in the Channel 4 soap opera Hollyoaks and Don Brady in A Touch of Frost.

Personal life 
McKenna lives in Sheffield, England with his wife and four children. McKenna has 7 SCE Ordinary Grades. McKenna is a fan of Frank Sinatra as well as Sammy Cahn and Dean Martin.

Career 
McKenna's first job was as a professional footballer. His football career with Sheffield Wednesday F.C. ended after a back injury.

McKenna has played Jack Osborne in the Channel 4 soap opera Hollyoaks since 1996 and is the second longest-serving character in the serial.

Filmography

References

External links 

1942 births
Living people
Male actors from Glasgow
Scottish male television actors
Scottish male soap opera actors